Rocket to Ramonia is an album by the Huntingtons released in 1996 in cooperation with the Flying Tart Recording Company, a division of Burnt Toast Vinyl. All tracks on the album are cover versions of Ramones songs. The album title is a reference to the Ramones album Rocket to Russia.

Album information
Produced by the HuntingtonsEngineered by Nick RotundoRecorded & Mixed in 15 hours at Clay Creek Recording, Newark, Delaware.Mastered by Barry Quinn at Masterfonics

Band Lineup
Cliffy Huntington: Guitar/Vocals
Mikey Huntington: Vocals/Bass
Mikee Huntington: Drums

Track listing
All songs written by Ramones.
 "Rockaway Beach"
 "Teenage Lobotomy"
 "Suzy Is a Headbanger"
 "Blitzkrieg Bop"
 "Oh Oh I Love Her So"
 "Judy Is a Punk"
 "I Want You Around"
 "Cretin Hop"
 "Slug"
 "She's the One"
 "Beat on the Brat"
 "You're Gonna Kill That Girl"
 "Sheena Is a Punk Rocker"
 "The KKK Took My Baby Away"
 "Rock 'N' Roll High School"

The Huntingtons albums
1996 albums
Ramones tribute albums